Aechmea winkleri is a plant species in the genus Aechmea. This species is endemic to the State of Rio Grande do Sul in southern Brazil.  It is small and has leaves that sometimes look purple.  The stem is red and has yellow flowers.

References

winkleri
Endemic flora of Brazil
Plants described in 1979